Giacoppo is an Italian surname. Notable people with the surname include:

Anthony Giacoppo (born 1986), Australian cyclist
Massimo Giacoppo (born 1983), Italian water polo player

Italian-language surnames
Patronymic surnames